Dogoše is a village and a suburb of Maribor on the right bank of the Drava River in northeastern Slovenia in the City Municipality of Maribor.

Name
Dogoše was first attested in 1458 as Lendorf (and in 1763–87 as Dragosche, Landorf). Based on the 18th-century transcription, the toponym is derived from the personal name Dragoš. The name is believed to have originally been Dragoši, meaning 'Dragoš and his people'.

History
Early settlement of the area is attested by the remnants of a building from antiquity along the road to Brezje (now part of Maribor). In addition to the building's foundations, the find included a small marble trough, which has been converted into a holy water font in the church in Brezje. Gold and silver Roman coins have also been found in the area. A fire station was built in Dogoše in 1928. Water mains were installed in the village in 1969.

Mass graves
Dogoše is the site of five known mass graves associated with the Second World War, known as the Tezno Woods 2–6 mass graves.

Cultural heritage
A post-Baroque chapel shrine with simple furnishings stands along the road to Brezje. There is a large, masonry column-shrine from the first half of the 18th century along the road to Miklavž na Dravskem Polju.

Notable natives
 Vekoslav Strmšek (1864–1907), educator

References

External links
Dogoše on Geopedia

Populated places in the City Municipality of Maribor